Dryfe Water is a river in Scotland about 18 miles in length which flows into the River Annan at , near Lockerbie.

Dryfe Water gives its name to the parish, Dryfesdale, and the common Scottish surname, Drysdale. A second name is the much less common surname Dryfe (or Drife). The meaning of the word Dryfe is unknown. It may be from the Old Norse, Anglo-Saxon or Brittonic languages which were all used at different times in Dumfriesshire.

References

Rivers of Dumfries and Galloway